The Ölfusá is a river in Iceland.  It begins at the junction between the Hvítá and Sog rivers, just north of the town of Selfoss, and flows for 25 km into the Atlantic ocean. It is Iceland's largest river by volume with an average discharge of 423 m³/s. Its drainage basin is 5760 km2.  The Ölfusá is home to a large salmon fishing industry.  The Flói Nature Reserve is located on its eastern shore near its mouth.

See also
List of rivers of Iceland

External links
Olfusa

Rivers of Iceland